The 1974–75 Alpha Ethniki was the 39th season of the highest football league of Greece. The season began on 29 September 1974 and ended on 8 June 1975. Olympiacos won their third consecutive and 20th Greek title.

The point system was: Win: 2 points - Draw: 1 point.

League table

Results

Top scorers

External links
Greek Wikipedia
Official Greek FA Site
Greek SuperLeague official Site
SuperLeague Statistics

Alpha Ethniki seasons
Greece
1974–75 in Greek football leagues